Matthew Westfall is an American writer, urbanist, and award-winning documentary filmmaker.

Personal life
He was born in New York City and was raised in Brookline, Massachusetts. He currently resides in the Philippines with his wife Laurie and their three daughters.

Career
As a documentary filmmaker, he made films that featured narrators such as Malcolm McDowell, Willem Dafoe, and F. Murray Abraham.

As a writer, he wrote the book The Devil's Causeway: The True Story of America's First Prisoners of War in the Philippines, and the Heroic Expedition Sent to Their Rescue, which was praised by 12th Philippine President Fidel V. Ramos, who referred to it as documenting "an epic tale of military campaigning and colonial conquest" and "proving once again that the truth is stranger than fiction" and called it "an inspiring story of courage, sacrifice, and patriotism by the various protagonists – regardless of nationality."

Award
He received the prestigious Paul Davidoff National Award for Advocacy Planning from the American Planning Association for his documentary On Borrowed Land executive produced by Oliver Stone and funded by the John D. and Catherine T. MacArthur Foundation.

References

Living people
American filmmakers
American male writers
Year of birth missing (living people)